Arthur Edwin Bottom (28 February 1930 – 18 April 2012) was an English footballer of the 1950s and 1960s. He played as a centre forward, and had a tremendously high goals to game ratio during his career, playing at several clubs; most notably York City and Newcastle United.

Playing career
Bottom's career began with Sheffield YMCA before he joined Sheffield United as a junior.

York City
In the 1954-55 season, was signed by York City. During his first season he scored 39 cup and league goals, an all-time club record for a single season. Eight of these goals came in York's run to the semi-finals of the FA Cup, including an equaliser in the semi-final against Newcastle United. The match ended 1-1, with Newcastle winning the replay, 2–0. The following season, Bottom scored 33 goals for York. Along with Billy Fenton, he holds the club record for most league goals scored in a season, scoring 31 goals in the league during 1955–56. Bottom is the sixth highest all-time scorer for York City, with a total of 105 goals from 158 appearances for the club.

Newcastle United
In 1958, Newcastle United signed Bottom from York for a £4,500 transfer fee. He scored seven goals in eight appearances – including two on his debut – for Newcastle that season, helping the club to avoid relegation. The following season, he made only three more appearances (scoring three goals) before he was transferred to Chesterfield for £5,000.

Later career
Bottom joined Boston United for the 1960-61 season, finishing the season as the club's top scorer with 17 goals. He later played for Alfreton Town in the Midland League.

Notes

External links
Arthur Bottom - An Appreciation 

1930 births
2012 deaths
Footballers from Sheffield
English footballers
Association football forwards
Sheffield United F.C. players
York City F.C. players
Newcastle United F.C. players
Chesterfield F.C. players
Boston United F.C. players
Alfreton Town F.C. players